Nigel Cayzer is a British businessman and chairman of two London-listed funds: Aberdeen Asian Smaller Companies Investment Trust and Oryx International Growth Fund. He served as chairman of the cancer care charity Maggie's from 2005 to 2014.

Early life and education

Nigel Cayzer was born on 30 April 1954, son of Anthony Galliers-Pratt and Angela Cayzer. He was named as heir to the estates of his uncle, Sir James Cayzer, Bt, and changed his surname to Nigel Cayzer by deed poll in 1982. He was educated at Eton College.

Career

Nigel Cayzer began his career working in the stock exchange for L Messel & Co. In 1986 he became a non-executive director of Caledonia Investments, a UK-listed investment trust company. In 1989 he became chairman of Allied Insurance Brokers (AIB). In 1991 the holding company's name was changed from Allied Insurance Brokers to Oriel. Oriel subsequently became the UK's leading motor warranty company.

In 1993 he oversaw the acquisition by the Oman National Insurance Company (ONIC) of an 18.7% stake in Oriel. The following year he established and became chairman of the Oryx JIA, an open-ended fund quoted on the Muscat Securities Market and invested principally in equities in Oman and other countries in the GCC. He held this position until 2007. He was a non-executive director of the Alliance Housing Bank SAOG between 1998 and 2006, and is the current chairman of the Oryx International Growth Fund.

In 1995 he became chairman of the newly formed Aberdeen Asian Smaller Companies Investment Trust PLC (AAS), a position he retains to the present day.

Nigel Cayzer served as chairman of the cancer care charity Maggie's between 2005 and 2014.

Personal life

Nigel Cayzer married Henrietta Sykes, daughter of Sir Richard Sykes, Bt, in 1986. The couple have four children.

References

1954 births
Living people
20th-century British businesspeople
21st-century British businesspeople
People educated at Eton College